The 2013–14 Butler Bulldogs men's basketball team represented Butler University in the 2013–14 NCAA Division I men's basketball season. Their head coach was Brandon Miller; on July 3, 2013, previous head coach Brad Stevens accepted the newly vacant Boston Celtics head coaching position in the National Basketball Association. The Bulldogs played their home games at Hinkle Fieldhouse, which has a capacity of approximately 10,000. This was the first year that Butler competed in the Big East Conference, as they moved from the Atlantic 10 Conference following the 2012–13 season.

The Bulldogs started the season off great and were cruising into their inaugural Big East conference games. However, once they started playing their in-conference games, they fell fast. Many of the games were characterized by leads late in the second half that the Bulldogs couldn't sustain and resulted as losses in either the last minute or overtime. Some of the games also resulted in blowouts. The Bulldogs were also faced with some player transfers and other adversity; Andrew Smeathers and Rene Castro  announced at various points during the season that they were transferring. Castro and Kameron Woods also faced suspensions from the team at various points during the season. The Bulldogs made an early exit in the Big East tournament, losing to Seton Hall in the first round, 50–51.

The season was the Bulldogs' first losing season since the 2004–05 season, and only the second in the past 21 years. It was also the first time in the past nine seasons that Butler did not win a game in the conference tournament.

Off season

During the offseason, Butler suffered two major blows. First, on July 3, 2013, head coach Brad Stevens left to take the vacant head coaching job with the NBA's Boston Celtics. Stevens was succeeded by Butler assistant Brandon Miller, hired three days later. The second blow came on August 16, when the school announced that Roosevelt Jones, the team's leading returning scorer from 2012 to 2013, tore ligaments in his left wrist during the team's trip to Australia and would undergo surgery that would force him to miss the entire season.

Departures

2013 recruiting class

Regular season
On November 4, 2013, after the two exhibition games, junior Andrew Smeathers announced that he was leaving the team. He finished the fall semester and transferred to Mount St. Mary's. On February 15, it was announced that freshman Rene Castro was transferring to another school. He had been suspended for three games during the season and according to Miller, was "dealing with a disciplinary team issue." Junior forward Kameron Woods was also temporarily suspended during the season; he did not make the trip to New York to play St. John's.

The team finished the season losing to Seton Hall in the first round of the Big East Championship.

Roster

Regular season

Schedule

|-
!colspan=12 style=| Australia Exhibition Trip

|-
!colspan=12 style="background:#13294B; color:#FFFFFF;"| Exhibition

|-
!colspan=12 style="background:#13294B; color:#FFFFFF;"| Non-Conference Regular Season

|-
!colspan=12 style="background:#13294B; color:#FFFFFF;"| Big East Conference Play

|-
!colspan=12 style="background:#13294B; color:#FFFFFF;"| Big East tournament

Awards

References

Butler
Butler Bulldogs men's basketball seasons
Butl
Butl